The , also  or , was a squadron commander of the ships of the line of the navy of the Republic of Venice.

History
Although it began using ailing ships in its battle line during the 15th century, the Venetian navy had traditionally been a galley-based force. During the 17th century sailing ships of the line began to play a more important role and comprised a larger and larger portion of the Venetian battle fleet, particularly during the War of Candia. 

The term  or  meant 'skipper', especially of galleys, but was also frequently applied to ships, especially the ship next in rank to the flagship (the ). Thus the title of   has the meaning of 'vice-admiral of the ships'.

Appointment to the post was usually for three years. As distinctive signs, the flagship of the  carried a single lantern aft, the standard of Saint Mark on the starboard side aft, and on the foremast or the mizzen mast a square ensign of Saint Mark.

References

Sources
 
 
 

Republic of Venice admirals
Military ranks of the Venetian navy
1657 establishments
17th-century establishments in the Republic of Venice